Belgian International Air Services (abbreviated BIAS) was a Belgian airline with its headquarters in Antwerp and Brussels. It was operational between 1959 and 1980 and offered mainly passenger and cargo air charter flights from Brussels Airport to the former Belgian colonies in Central Africa.

History

BIAS was founded on 1 July 1959 by Charles van Antwerpen and George Richardson. The first commercial flight (between Rotterdam and London) took place a week later. In 1967, a co-operation contract with SABENA, the Belgian flag carrier airline was signed, which saw BIAS operating scheduled commuter flights out of Brussels Airport. These were branded as Common Market Commuter, using de Havilland Heron aircraft. The first of these flights (from Eindhoven to Rotterdam) took place on 28 August of that year. The co-operation with SABENA lasted until 1975.

Long-haul flight operations with BIAS had already ended in February 1973, when Compagnie Maritime Belge, its majority shareholder at that time, decided that the fleet of Douglas DC-8 aircraft be integrated into Delta Air Transport. When the commuter flights also came to an end in 1975, BIAS continued to do business as an aircraft lease provider until 1980, when the company was dismantled.

Fleet
Over the years, BIAS operated the following aircraft types:

Accidents and incidents
On 18 February 1966 at 02:04 UTC, a BIAS Douglas DC-6 cargo aircraft (registered OO-ABG) overshot the runway upon landing at Malpensa Airport following a flight from Brussels with 241 calves on board. The aircraft caught fire and was completely destroyed when it crashed into a stand of trees, killing the four occupants.
On 28 March 1969, a BIAS Douglas DC-3 (registered OO-SBH) was damaged beyond repair in a wheels-up landing in the Libyan Desert. The 17 passengers on board survived the crash.

References

External links

Defunct airlines of Belgium
Airlines established in 1959
Airlines disestablished in 1980
1980 disestablishments in Belgium
Belgian companies established in 1959